Kenninghall is a village and civil parish in Norfolk, England, with an area of  and a population of 950 at the 2011 census.
It falls within the local government district of Breckland. Home to the kings of East Anglia, after the Norman invasion of 1066 William the Conqueror granted the estate to William of Albany and his heirs as a residence for the Chief Butler of England.

Origin of the name
It has been claimed that the name Kenninghall comes from the Saxon word Cyning (king) and Halla (palace), but this is debated, with other writers deriving it from the personal name "Cyna" and the Old English "hala", a clearing in the woods. In maps of the Elizabethan period the house is shown as 'Keningal'.

History

In the reign of Henry VIII, the estate was granted to Thomas Howard, 2nd Duke of Norfolk, who destroyed the original structure and erected a magnificent new building with two fronts. The house and estate passed to Thomas Howard, 3rd Duke of Norfolk. The estate was confiscated by the Crown when he was arrested on suspicion of treason. The house served as a residence for both of Henry VIII's daughters: Princess Mary and Princess Elizabeth at different times during the reign of Edward VI. When Mary became Queen in 1553, she granted the estate to the 3rd Duke's grandson, Thomas Howard, 4th Duke of Norfolk.

The 4th Duke held the estate until 1572, when he was attainted for high treason. Howard had been brought up a Protestant, but entered Roman Catholic plots (including the Northern Rebellion and the Ridolfi Plot) to depose Elizabeth I and replace her with Mary, Queen of Scots, whom he planned to marry. The estate was seized by the Crown, and Queen Elizabeth often resided here. When she died in 1603, the house was demolished and the materials sold off.

Between 1727 and 1760, George II issued a charter declaring the inhabitants of Kenninghall exempt from serving in juries outside the parish, and from tolls at fairs across the kingdom.

St Mary's Church
The south porch is Transitional Norman. The royal arms of Queen Elizabeth has been moved from the tympanum of the chancel arch to a position in the north aisle. The royal arms of King Charles I is at the west end of the church.

Notable people
Jane Howard, Countess of Westmorland, was buried 30 June 1593 at St Mary's Church, Kenninghall.
The poet, author and translator Oliver Bernard lived in a tiny cottage in Kenninghall until his death in June 2013.
Elizabeth Leyburn, Duchess of Norfolk, was buried at St. Mary's Church, as well.

Notes

External links 
Literary Norfolk
Norfolk Churches

Villages in Norfolk
Civil parishes in Norfolk
Breckland District